The Gardens Mall is a two-story, enclosed shopping mall in Palm Beach Gardens, Florida. Its anchors are Macy's, Sears, Bloomingdale's, Nordstrom and Saks Fifth Avenue, and it features more than 160 specialty shops and restaurants.

History
The Gardens Mall, originally called The Gardens of The Palm Beaches, was developed by The Forbes Company, based in Southfield, Michigan. On October 5, 1988, the mall opened with three initial anchor stores: Burdines, Sears and the second Macy's in Florida. Bloomingdales and Saks Fifth Avenue joined as tenants in 1990. Burdines was shuttered in 2003 as Federated Department Stores (now Macy's, Inc.), the owners of the Macy's chain, consolidated all its nameplates into the Macy's brand, which already had a location at the mall. In March 2006, Nordstrom opened on the former Burdines site instead.

In 2005, the Florida Department of Transportation completed a new interchange at PGA Boulevard (SR 786) and SR 811, providing direct access from the mall entrance to I-95.

In December 2005, former baseball all-star Jeff Reardon was taken into custody and charged by the Palm Beach Gardens, Florida Police Department for allegedly committing armed robbery at the former Hamilton Jewelers store.

In October 2007, the mall underwent minor renovations as the fountain in the center was altered and the center court's garden theme was replaced with a more modern look.
H&M opened in 2010 as a new junior anchor and closed in 2021. In April 2019, Macy's opened Macy's Backstage. In Spring of 2021, Gardens Optical opened in the vacant space that was formerly Sears Optical inside of the store.

Along with The Florida Mall in Orlando and a standalone store in Miami, The Gardens Mall is home to one of three last remaining Sears stores in Florida.

Anchors
 Macy's/Macy's Backstage
 Bloomingdale's
 Saks Fifth Avenue
 Nordstrom
 Sears

Junior Anchors
 H&M (2010 - 2021)

Former Anchors
 Burdines

References

Shopping malls in Palm Beach County, Florida
Shopping malls established in 1988
1988 establishments in Florida
Palm Beach Gardens, Florida